Criminal Girls 2: Party Favors, known in Japan as simply , is a role-playing video game developed and published by Nippon Ichi Software for PlayStation Vita in 2015-2016. It is the sequel to the 2010 PlayStation Portable video game Criminal Girls.

Reception

The game received average reviews, a bit more favorable than Invite Only, according to the review aggregation website Metacritic. Pocket Gamer thought that the battle system compensated for the game's "shady veneer". In Japan, Famitsu gave it a score of one seven, two eights, and one seven for a total of 30 out of 40.

References

External links
 

2015 video games
Erotic video games
Nippon Ichi Software games
PlayStation Vita games
PlayStation Vita-only games
Role-playing video games
Single-player video games
Video game sequels
Video games developed in Japan